Howard Percy Melbourne Smith (7 March 1878 – 10 August 1909) was an Australian rules footballer who played with St Kilda in the Victorian Football League (VFL).

Notes

External links 

1878 births
1909 deaths
Australian rules footballers from Melbourne
St Kilda Football Club players
People from Prahran, Victoria